Easton is a village in the South Kesteven district of Lincolnshire, England, almost  north of Colsterworth, and  east of the A1 road. It belongs to the civil parish of Stoke Rochford.

History
The village has no church, but forms part of the North and South Stoke with Easton church parish, which contains the church of St Andrew and St Mary at Stoke Rochford, just inside Easton civil parish. The A1 within the parish was straightened when converted to a dual-carriageway in 1960. The village is still largely the size as it was at the time of the Domesday Book.

Easton Hall

Sir Henry Cholmeley bought the manor in 1592; his direct descendant Sir Montague Cholmeley rebuilt the village in the early 19th century. Easton Hall (52°49'46.04"N 0°37'29.34"W) was built by Sir Henry Cholmeley, partly rebuilt in 1805, and enlarged in the Victorian period. It was damaged while used by the army during the Second World War and pulled down in 1951. The 12 acres of gardens were abandoned in 1951, but a major renovation project began in 2001, under the Cholmeley family, who still live in the village.

Andrew Alexander Watt, an Anglo-Irish distiller, lived here from 1922 to 1928.

Geography
The River Witham passes through the village. Just to its south, the river is crossed by the A1 inside the parish of Colsterworth. Although a village with a population of 100 and technically a civil parish, in practice it is shared for administrative and religious purposes with Stoke Rochford. The combined parish is one of the largest in area in South Kesteven, stretching along the B6403 (High Dike – ⁣Ermine Street) from the A1 to the East Coast Main Line bridge.

There was a railway joining the East Central main line at the B6403 road bridge and following the east side of the B6403 to Woolsthorpe. Stoke Rochford is linked to the B6403 by Easton Lane. Easton civil parish stretches along the B6403 from the A1 to the junction of this road; it embraces the south part of Stoke Rochford village, including its parish church and post office. In the south-east of the parish is Easton Wood.

Cold store
Near the B6403 is Easton Cold Store, a frozen-vegetable processing factory owned by McCain Foods (GB) Ltd. Described in Nikolaus Pevsner's Buildings of England: Lincolnshire as the largest cold storage facility in Europe (1989) originally built for Christian Salveson. In front of the vast sheds, the contrasting polygonal office building connected to a two-storey block with red pagoda-like projections of 1973-4 by Rex Critchlow are considered one of the best examples of industrial architecture in the county.

See also
Destruction of country houses in 20th-century Britain

References
Citations

Sources

External links

Easton Walled Gardens website
The Easton Estate website 
Statistics about Easton, South Kesteven
Stoke Rochford and Easton Parish Council

Villages in Lincolnshire
Gardens in Lincolnshire
Civil parishes in Lincolnshire
South Kesteven District